Harrah is a city in Oklahoma County, Oklahoma, United States, and a part of the  Oklahoma City metropolitan area.

The first settler of the area, who was Potawatomi, arrived in the 1870s, but the town was not incorporated until 1908. The town was settled by Americans, Polish immigrants, and other groups and had a cotton ginning center. The city is overseen by a city council and mayor and includes a police department and fire station.

Geography

It lies partly in the Great Plains near the geographical center of the 48 contiguous states in the United States. It lies between the larger cities of Oklahoma City to the west and Shawnee, to the east, in Oklahoma County.

Harrah is located in the Crosstimbers ecoregion and the Frontier Country tourism region.

Climate
Oklahoma is located in a temperate region and experiences occasional extremes of temperature and precipitation typical of a continental climate. Harrah lies in an area known as Tornado Alley characterized by frequent interaction between cold and warm air masses producing severe weather. An average of 54 tornadoes strike the state per year.

The city frequently experiences temperatures above 100 °F (38 °C).

History
The land that would become the town of Harrah had its first settler, Louis Navarre, in the 1870s. Navarre, was a member of the Potawatomi people who had signed an 1867 treaty to sell their Kansas lands in order to purchase lands in Native Territory with the proceeds. They also became citizens of the United States and thus became known as the Citizen Potawatomi.

 
In 1890, Navarre and the Citizen Potawatomi participated, unwillingly, in the allotment process implemented through the Dawes Act of 1887. With this Act, the Citizen Potawatomi people were forced to accept individual allotments.

Frank Harrah, for whom the town is named, purchased  from Louis Navarre's allotment in April 1898 and early settlers included a large number of Polish immigrants. More than two million Poles entered American ports between 1897 and 1913, and the immigrants formed small communities around Choctaw Nation coal mines.

Originally named Sweeney, after E.W. Sweeney, who operated a ferry beginning in 1891, the town was renamed Harrah on December 22, 1898, and was incorporated in 1908. The town was almost renamed Clubb.

In the 1940s Harrah was a center of cotton ginning. Its population was 741 in 1950.  By 1990 4,206 people lived in Harrah.

Demographics

As of the 2018 census, there were 6,360 people. As of the 2010 census, The population density was 428 people per square mile. The racial makeup of the city was 84% white, 1% African American, 7.3% Native American, 0.7% Asian, 0.7% from other races, and 6.3% from two or more races. Hispanic or Latino of any race made up 4% of the population.

Of the 1,960 households, 33% had children under the age of 18 living with them, 57.6% consisted of married couples living together, 10.8% had a female householder with no husband present, and 26.3% were non-families. 22.7% of the households are occupied by a single individual, and 26.1 percent had someone living alone who was 65 years of age or older. The average household size was 2.57 and the average family size was 3.02.

In the city, the population was spread out, with 25.8% under the age of 18, 30.3% from 18 to 64, and 14.5% who were 65 years of age or older. The median age was 38.5 years. The population is 52.1% female and 47.9% male.

The median income for a household in the city was $56,302, and the median income for a family was $76,725. The per capita income for the city was $25,545. About 6.1% of families and 8.4% of the population were below the poverty line, including 17.1% of those under age 18 and 4.7% of those age 65 or over.

City government

The City of Harrah has a city council made up of elected officials and led by a mayor. A council-appointed city manager runs the day-to-day administration of the city and oversees city staff. The city also holds a municipal court twice a month.

As of April 2013, the city council consists of Mayor Larry Fryar and council members Kimberly Bishop, Tom Barron, Duane Patterson, and Cass Smith.

The City of Harrah includes several departments, including a small fire department consisting of several paid firefighters and many volunteer firefighters. The police department includes full-time detectives, patrol officers, part-time officers, and voluntary reserve officers. The city also offers a comprehensive set of public utilities managed by the utility department and a public works department.

Education
The city lies in the Harrah school district, with some western parts of the city in the Choctaw-Nicoma Park school district. Both districts offer primary and secondary school education. Harrah schools spend approximately $3,204 per student and have 16 students per teacher.

No higher education institutions exist in Harrah.  Oklahoma Baptist University is located approximately 30 miles to the southeast in Shawnee, Oklahoma, and other options lie 30–45 minutes to the west in Oklahoma City and to the southwest in Norman.

Notable people
Jason Boland, Red Dirt singer and guitar player for Jason Boland and The Stragglers.
Lance Cargill, political consultant, former Speaker of the Oklahoma House of Representatives.
Matt Grice, UFC fighter
Tim Holt, Western genre actor, buried here in 1973
Dale Robertson, western actor was born in Harrah in 1923
Lloyd Waner, Hall of Fame Baseball player with the Pittsburgh Pirates
Paul Waner, Hall of Fame Baseball player with the Pittsburgh Pirates
Brady Manek, NBA basketball player who grew up in Harrah

References

External links
 City of Harrah official website
 Encyclopedia of Oklahoma History and Culture - Harrah
 

Oklahoma City metropolitan area
Cities in Oklahoma County, Oklahoma
Cities in Oklahoma